Hapoel Even Yehuda F.C. was a 1950s-era football club from Even Yehuda, Israel.

History
The club was established in 1949, and entered the second division, finishing seventh in the Sharon division, which meant the club was placed in Liga Gimel (third division) for the next season. The club won its division in 1954–55 and promoted Liga Bet, which became the new third tier, following restructuring of the Israeli football league system. The club remained in Liga Bet until the end of the 1959–60 season, after which the club folded.

Another club representing the town, M.S. Even Yehuda operated between 1962 and 1973.

Honours

League

References

Defunct football clubs in Israel
 Hapoel football clubs